The Stamp Museum is a museum in Ankara, Turkey.

The building
The museum building was the headquarters of a former bank named Emlak ve Eytam Bank. It was planned by Clemens Holzmeister, the renown Austrian architect and was built in 1933-34 term. After the bank was merged to another bank in 1946  the building was handed over to Turkish PTT. In 2013 after renovation the building was opened to public as a stamp museum.

Collections
The Turkish and the  Ottoman as well as some foreign postage stamps are displayed in the museum. There are also thematic collections shown below: 

Cultural heritage
Atatürk (founder of Turkey)
Vehicles 
Sports 
Nature
Tourism

References

Museums in Altındağ, Ankara
Ulus, Ankara
Buildings and structures in Ankara
2001 establishments in Turkey
1934 in Turkey
2013 in Turkey
Architecture in Turkey
Postal museums
Altındağ, Ankara